(French for "stable jurisprudence", or literally, "constant jurisprudence") is a legal doctrine according to which a long series of previous decisions applying a particular legal principle or rule is highly persuasive but not controlling in subsequent cases dealing with similar or identical issues of law.  This doctrine is recognized in most civil law jurisdictions as well as in certain mixed jurisdictions, e.g., Louisiana.

See also

 Court

References

Civil law (legal system)
Legal doctrines and principles
Civil law legal terminology
Judicial legal terminology